Chelis caecilia is a moth in the family Erebidae. It was described by Kindermann in 1853. It is found in Russia (Altai, Khakasia, western Buryatia) and Mongolia.

Subspecies
Chelis caecilia caecilia
Chelis caecilia slivnoensis (Rebel, 1903)

References

Natural History Museum Lepidoptera generic names catalog

External links
Lepiforum.de

Moths described in 1853
Arctiina